Charles Martin Colombo (July 20, 1920 – May 7, 1986) was an American soccer player who earned 11 caps as center-half for the United States men's national soccer team.  He is a member of the National Soccer Hall of Fame. He also played for the United States at the 1948 Summer Olympics.

Biography
Born and raised in The Hill area of St. Louis, Missouri, Colombo played professionally for St. Louis Simpkins-Ford, winning National Challenge Cup medals with them in 1948 and 1950. He was known as "Gloves" because he always wore gloves when he played, regardless of the weather.

Colombo played for the U.S. team from 1948 to 1952, including the 1–0 upset victory over England in the 1950 FIFA World Cup, in which his foul against Blackpool forward Stanley Mortensen in the second half gave England the chance to tie the game. The header from the resulting free kick came very close to scoring a goal, but was saved by goalkeeper Frank Borghi at the last second.

The day after U.S. victory, Colombo was offered an opportunity to play professional soccer in Brazil, but he turned it down and returned to his St. Louis club team. He later became the coach of the St. Louis Ambrose team.

He is buried in Old Saints Peter and Paul Catholic Cemetery, in St Louis, Missouri.

References

 
 Cirino Antonio (Tony): US Soccer Vs The World, Damon Press 1983 – 

1920 births
1986 deaths
United States men's international soccer players
Olympic soccer players of the United States
Footballers at the 1948 Summer Olympics
Footballers at the 1952 Summer Olympics
1950 FIFA World Cup players
National Soccer Hall of Fame members
St. Louis Simpkins-Ford players
Soccer players from St. Louis
American soccer players
Association football central defenders